The great chain of being is a hierarchical structure of all matter and life, thought by medieval Christianity to have been decreed by God. The chain begins with God and descends through angels, humans, animals and plants to minerals.

The great chain of being ("Ladder of Being") is a concept derived from Plato, Aristotle (in his Historia Animalium), Plotinus and Proclus. Further developed during the Middle Ages, it reached full expression in early modern Neoplatonism.

Divisions

The chain of being hierarchy has God at the top, above angels, which like him are entirely spirit, without material bodies, and hence unchangeable. Beneath them are humans, consisting both of spirit and matter; they change and die, and are thus essentially impermanent. Lower are animals and plants. At the bottom are the mineral materials of the earth itself; they consist only of matter. Thus, the higher the being is in the chain, the more attributes it has, including all the attributes of the beings below it. The minerals are, in the medieval mind, a possible exception to the immutability of the material beings in the chain, as alchemy promised to turn lower elements like lead into those higher up the chain, like silver or gold.

The Great Chain 

The Great Chain of being links God, angels, humans, animals, plants, and minerals. The links of the chain are:

God

God is the creator of all things. He created the entire universe and everything in it. He has spiritual attributes found in angels and humans. God has unique attributes of Omnipotence, Omnipresence, and Omniscience. He is the model of  perfection in all of creation.

Angelic beings

 Seraphim - Spirits of Love
 Cherubim - Spirits of Harmony
 Thrones - Record Keepers of Universal Laws
 Dominions - Spirits of Wisdom and Knowledge
 Virtues - Angels of Movement and Free Will
 Powers - Angels of Form and Space
 Principalities - Angels of Time and Personality
 Archangels
 Angels - Governers of Spirits of Nature

Humanity

Humans uniquely share spiritual attributes with God and the angels above them, Love and language, and physical attributes with the animals below them, like having material bodies that experienced emotions and sensations such as lust and pain, and physical needs such as hunger and thirst.

Animals

Animals have senses, are able to move, and have physical appetites. The apex predator like the lion, could move vigorously, and has powerful senses like keen eyesight and the ability to smell their prey from a distance, while a lower order of animals might wiggle or crawl, or like oysters were sessile, attached to the sea-bed. All, however, share the senses of touch and taste.

Plants

Plants lacked sense organs and the ability to move, but they could grow and reproduce. The highest plants have important healing attributes within their leaves, buds, and flowers. 
A lower classification of plants would be mushrooms, and moss, or any of that belonging to the Fungi Kingdom.

Minerals

At the bottom of the chain, minerals were unable to move, sense, grow, or reproduce. Their attributes were being solid and strong, while the gemstones possessed magic. The king of gems was the diamond.

Natural science

From Aristotle to Linnaeus

The basic idea of a ranking of the world's organisms goes back to Aristotle's biology. In his History of Animals, where he ranked animals over plants based on their ability to move and sense, and graded the animals by their reproductive mode, live birth being "higher" than laying cold eggs, and possession of blood, warm-blooded mammals and birds again being "higher" than "bloodless" invertebrates.

Aristotle's non-religious concept of higher and lower organisms was taken up by natural philosophers during the Scholastic period to form the basis of the Scala Naturae. The scala allowed for an ordering of beings, thus forming a basis for classification where each kind of mineral, plant and animal could be slotted into place. In medieval times, the great chain was seen as a God-given and unchangeable ordering. In the Northern Renaissance, the scientific focus shifted to biology; the threefold division of the chain below humans formed the basis for Carl Linnaeus's Systema Naturæ from 1737, where he divided the physical components of the world into the three familiar kingdoms of minerals, plants and animals.

In alchemy

Alchemy used the great chain as the basis for its cosmology. Since all beings were linked into a chain, so that there was a fundamental unity of all matter, the transformation from one place in the chain to the next might, according to alchemical reasoning, be possible. In turn, the unit of the matter enabled alchemy to make another key assumption, the philosopher's stone, which somehow gathered and concentrated the universal spirit found in all matter along the chain, and which ex hypothesi might enable the alchemical transformation of one substance to another, such as the base metal lead to the noble metal gold.

Scala Naturae in evolution

The set nature of species, and thus the absoluteness of creatures' places in the great chain, came into question during the 18th century. The dual nature of the chain, divided yet united, had always allowed for seeing creation as essentially one continuous whole, with the potential for overlap between the links. Radical thinkers like Jean-Baptiste Lamarck saw a progression of life forms from the simplest creatures striving towards complexity and perfection, a schema accepted by zoologists like Henri de Blainville. The very idea of an ordering of organisms, even if supposedly fixed, laid the basis for the idea of transmutation of species, whether progressive goal-directed orthogenesis or Charles Darwin's undirected theory of evolution.

The chain of being continued to be part of metaphysics in 19th-century education, and the concept was well known. The geologist Charles Lyell used it as a metaphor in his 1851 Elements of Geology description of the geological column, where he used the term "missing links" about missing parts of the continuum. The term "missing link" later came to signify transitional fossils, particularly those bridging the gulf between man and beasts.

The idea of the great chain, as well as the derived "missing link", was abandoned in early 20th-century science, as the notion of modern animals representing ancestors of other modern animals was abandoned in biology. The idea of a certain sequence from "lower" to "higher" however lingers on, as does the idea of progress in biology.

Politics

Allenby and Garreau propose that the Catholic Church's narrative of the great chain of being kept the peace in Europe for centuries. The very concept of rebellion simply lay outside the reality within which most people lived, for to defy the King was to defy God. King James I himself wrote, "The state of monarchy is the most supreme thing upon earth: for kings are not only God's Lieutenants upon earth, and sit upon God's throne, but even by God himself they are called Gods." The Enlightenment broke this supposed divine plan, and fought the last vestiges of feudal hierarchy, by creating secular governmental structures that vested power into the hands of ordinary citizens, rather than in those of divinely ordained monarchs.

Adaptations and similar concepts

The American philosopher Ken Wilber described a "Great Nest of Being" which he claims to belong to a culture-independent "perennial philosophy" traceable across 3000 years of mystical and esoteric writings. Wilber's system corresponds with other concepts of transpersonal psychology. In his 1977 book A Guide for the Perplexed, the economist E. F. Schumacher described a hierarchy of beings, with humans at the top able mindfully to perceive the "eternal now".

See also

References

Sources

Further reading

 Miguel Espinoza, La Hiérarchie naturelle. Matière, vie, conscience et symbole, L'Harmattan, Paris, 2022.

 Tillyard, E. M. W. (1942) The Elizabethan World Picture: A Study of the Idea of Order in the age of Shakespeare, Donne & Milton. New York: Random House

External links
 Dictionary of the History of Ideas – Chain of Being
 The Great Chain of Being reflected in the work of Descartes, Spinoza & Leibniz  Peter Suber, Earlham College, Indiana
 The Chain of Being: Tillyard in a Nutshell

Alchemical concepts
Philosophical theories
Christian philosophy
Hierarchy
Metaphysics of religion
Natural philosophy
Neoplatonism
Obsolete biology theories
Aristotelianism
Western esotericism